The 1980 Individual Long Track World Championship was the tenth edition of the FIM speedway Individual Long Track World Championship. The event was held on 14 September 1980 at Scheeßel in West Germany.

The World title was won by Karl Maier of West Germany. The Championship consisted of four qualifying rounds at Harsewinkel, Korskro, Hamburg-Farmsen, Pfarrkirchen won by Bruce Penhall, Ivan Mauger, Egon Müller and Georg Hack respectively and two semi finals in Jübek and Gornja Radgona won by Ole Olsen and Josef Aigner.

Final Classification 

+ Alois Wiesböck finished third but was disqualified because his engine was found to be over the prescribed limit. Bronze medals were awarded to both Betzl and Aigner.

References 

1981
Sport in West Germany
Sports competitions in West Germany
Motor
Motor